Bilder, die die Welt bewegten is a German documentary series, broadcast between 1980 and 1984 on ZDF.  The title translates as Images That Changed The World.  The series presented film footage of major natural disasters, technological disasters, and accidents.  The series was directed and narrated by journalist Peter von Zahn.

See also
List of German television series

External links
 

German documentary television series
1980 German television series debuts
1984 German television series endings
ZDF original programming
German-language television shows